"You've Got to Stand for Something" is a song co-written and recorded by American country music singer Aaron Tippin. It was released in October 1990 as his debut single and the title track to his album You've Got to Stand for Something. It reached the top ten on the country singles chart in early 1991. Tippin wrote the song with Buddy Brock. Charley Pride later recorded the song in 1992 and released it as a single that year.

Content
"You've Got to Stand for Something" is a mid-tempo, exemplifying the patriotic blue collar themes that would show up in many of his later songs as well. In it, the narrator recalls the life lessons taught to him by his father, who told him that he should stand up for his moral convictions.

In 1990, comedian Bob Hope heard Tippin perform the song, and invited Tippin to sing it on his USO tour for soldiers who were serving in the Gulf War at the time.

Music video
This was his first music video and was directed by Bing Sokolsky and premiered in early 1991.

Chart history

Year-end charts

References

1990 debut singles
1990 songs
Aaron Tippin songs
Charley Pride songs
Song recordings produced by Emory Gordy Jr.
Songs written by Aaron Tippin
Songs written by Buddy Brock
RCA Records singles